Forever Lulu (also known as Along for the Ride) is a 2000 American romantic comedy film directed by John Kaye starring Melanie Griffith, Penelope Ann Miller and Patrick Swayze.

Plot 
Ben and Lulu were one time college sweethearts who shared an intense passionate affair that circled around Lulu's untreated mental health condition, a condition which eventually leads to her hospitalisation and their separation.

Now Ben is a successful professional writer in a personally distant relationship with his wife Claire.   Lulu leaves her treatment facility and seeks out a reluctant Ben to reveal that fifteen years ago they had a child whom she placed in adoption.  Determined to meet him on his fifteenth birthday, Lulu asks Ben to join her on a cross country road trip to find their son.  Bound at first by his need to protect Lulu from herself, Ben's uncertainty about the free-spirited Lulu is replaced with tender memories of their love affair and her vulnerable health.

As they journey, Ben's current life is shared through Claire, who has flown out to intercept the pair.  Tensions between the three culminate with Claire telling Lulu about Ben and Claire's son who died the year before.  A shaken Lulu calls to Ben, with Claire present, to open up about his son who died and the son they are about to meet.  All three characters connect, and in the process, Ben rediscovers his heart.

Cast 
 Melanie Griffith as Lulu McAfee
 Penelope Ann Miller as Claire Clifton
 Patrick Swayze as Ben Clifton
 Joseph Gordon-Levitt as Martin Ellsworth
 Richard Schiff as Jerome Ellsworth
 Annie Corley as Millie Ellsworth
 Lee Garlington as Linda Davis
 Michael J. Pollard as Hippie
 Ryan Bollman as Freddie

External links 

2000 films
2000 romantic comedy films
American romantic comedy films
Artisan Entertainment films
2000s English-language films
Films produced by Boaz Davidson
Films about writers
2000s American films